Robert Joseph Randisi (born August 24, 1951) is an American author, editor and screenwriter who writes in the detective and Western genres.

Biography
Randisi has authored more than 650 published books and has edited more than 30 anthologies of short stories. Booklist magazine said he "may be the last of the pulp writers." He has had a book published every month since January 1982. In 1984 he wrote 27 books in 12 months.

He co-founded and edited Mystery Scene magazine and co-founded the American Crime Writers League. He founded The Private Eye Writers of America in 1981, where he created the Shamus Award. He co-founded The American Crime Writers League; co-founded Western Fictioneers, and co=created The Peacemaker award.

He has co-written several mystery novels with soap opera actress Eileen Davidson: Death in Daytime (2008), Dial Emmy for Murder (2009), Diva Las Vegas (2010), and Swinging in the Rain (2011). Collaborated with actor, and poker commentator Vince Van Patten on "The Picasso Flop" and 'The Judgment Fold."

Notable characters appearing in some of his novels include "Miles Jacoby,"  "Joe Keough," "Nick Delvecchio," "Gil and Claire Hunt," Truxton Lewis," "Eddie G." and The Rat Pack. As J. R. Roberts, he has written over 500 adult westerns featuring his character "Clint Adams - The Gunsmith".

References

External links
 Author Profile at Piccadilly Publishing on the digital release of "Clint Adams, the Gunsmith" series
 Bibliography on the Fantastic Fiction website
 Mystery Scene Magazine

21st-century American novelists
American male novelists
1951 births
Living people
Shamus Award winners
21st-century American male writers